These are the lists of Eurovision Song Contest entries:

 List of Eurovision Song Contest entries (1956–2003)
 List of Eurovision Song Contest entries (2004–present)

See also 
 List of Junior Eurovision Song Contest entries
 List of Eurovision Song Contest winners

entries
Lists of songs
Lists of singers